Progressive Dawoodi Bohra also known as Bohra Youth is a reform movement within the Dawoodi Bohra subsect of Mustaali Ismai'li Shi'a Islam. They disagree with mainstream Dawoodi Bohra, as led by the incumbent Da'i al-Mutlaq, on doctrinal, economic, and social issues and broke off .

The Progressive Dawoodi Bohra were led by Asghar Ali Engineer, until his death in 2013. Engineer had alleged that the 51st Da'i al-Mutlaq, Taher Saifuddin, claimed infallibility and issued new doctrines pronouncing that all properties owned by the Bohras (including mosques) belonged to the Syedna, and that they are mere  (account keepers) on his behalf. Further, Saifuddin professed to have instituted a doctrine of Raza, which required that his followers do nothing (secular or religious, including namaz) without first attaining his permission. The policy of requiring a Raza began in 1902, when the 50th Da'i al-Mutlaq, Abdullah Badruddin, demanded that it be sought before construction of a secular school in Burhanpur could begin. Several Bohras challenged Badruddin's and then his successor Saifuddin's authority through litigation in Mumbai courts and the Syedna's claims were accepted by the judge.

Beliefs and practices 
The Progressives are subject to baraat, a form of excommunication that disallows other community members from speaking to them and bans them from mosques, and liken this situation to that of untouchables.

The Progressive Dawoodi Bohra community also claims that the 52nd Da'i Syedna Mohammad Burhanuddin asserted the same rights as Saifuddin.  The ruling was appealed before the Rajasthan High Court at Jodhpur. Progressive Bohras claimed that the Waqf Act of 1954 provided exclusive control of property such as mosques to the Waqf Board, and that the Syedna had no rights over them.

History of the Imāmī-Progressive Dawoodi Bohra 

{| class="" style="float:center; margin: 2ex 0 0.6em 0.5em; width: 8em; line-height:111%;" 
!The schematic history of the development of the Imāmī-Mustā‘līan Progressive Dawoodi Bohra from other Shī‘ah Muslim sects
|-
|

See also
Alavi Bohra
Atba-i-Malak
Atba-e-Malak Badar
Atba-i-Malak Vakil
Dawoodi Bohra
Hebtiahs Bohra
Patani Bohras
Sulaymani Bohra
Sunni Bohra

References

External links 
 Progressive Dawoodi Bohras

Dawoodi Bohras
Tayyibi Isma'ili branches